Azubah, עזובה, meaning "deserted", is the name of two women in the Bible: 

 Azubah (wife of Caleb), the wife of Caleb 
 Azubah (mother of Jehoshaphat), daughter of Shilhi, and mother of Jehoshaphat, King of Judah

See also
Azabache
Azubu
Azuben
Azzaba (disambiguation)